Tom Kempers (born 1 June 1969) is a former tennis player from the Netherlands. Kempers won four doubles titles during his professional career. He reached his highest doubles ATP ranking on August 10, 1998 when he became the number 42 in the world, though he never won a singles title in his career. Kempers currently is a sponsor relationship manager of the foundation spieren voor spieren that supports research on neuromuscular diseases.

Doubles titles (4)

References

External links
 
 

1969 births
Living people
Dutch male tennis players
People from Bussum
Sportspeople from North Holland